Raimondo Castelli (died 14 July 1670) was a Roman Catholic prelate who served as Bishop of Narni (1656–1670).

Biography
On 26 Jue 1656, Raimondo Castelli was appointed during the papacy of Pope Alexander VII as Bishop of Narni. On 2 July 1656, he was consecrated bishop by Giovanni Battista Maria Pallotta, Cardinal-Priest of San Pietro in Vincoli, with Patrizio Donati, Bishop Emeritus of Minori, and Ranuccio Scotti Douglas, Bishop Emeritus of Borgo San Donnino, serving as co-consecrators. He served as Bishop of Narni until his death on 14 July 1670.

See also
Catholic Church in Italy

References

External links and additional sources
 (Chronology of Bishops) 
 (Chronology of Bishops) 

17th-century Italian Roman Catholic bishops
Bishops appointed by Pope Alexander VII
1670 deaths